Henry West Rennison was Dean of Armagh from 1955 to 1965.

Rennison was educated at Trinity College, Dublin and was ordained in 1911. After  curacies in Desertcreat and Drumcree he became the incumbent at Ballymascanlan in 1929.

References

Alumni of Trinity College Dublin
Deans of Armagh
20th-century Irish Anglican priests